Ian Peters (born 1941) is a former New Zealand politician of the National and New Zealand First parties.

Personal life
Peters was born in Kawakawa in 1941. He is a brother of NZ First MP, leader and minister, Winston Peters, and former NZ First MP Jim Peters.

Another brother, Ron Peters, stood for New Zealand First in Hobson in 1993, coming third; and for Northland in 1996, coming second.

Member of Parliament

He represented the Tongariro electorate in Parliament from 1990 to 1993, when he was defeated by Mark Burton. He stood unsuccessfully against Burton for the replacement seat of Taupo in 1996, for the New Zealand First party.

Since leaving politics, he has been a senior staffer at Te Puni Kōkiri in Whangarei.

References

 1990 Parliamentary Candidates for the New Zealand National Party by John Stringer (New Zealand National Party, 1990)

1941 births
Living people
Māori MPs
New Zealand National Party MPs
New Zealand First politicians
Ngāti Wai people
People from Kawakawa, New Zealand
Unsuccessful candidates in the 1996 New Zealand general election
Unsuccessful candidates in the 1993 New Zealand general election
Unsuccessful candidates in the 1987 New Zealand general election
Members of the New Zealand House of Representatives
New Zealand MPs for North Island electorates